Roman Kukhtinov (born December 1, 1975) is a Russian ice hockey defender who is currently playing for HC Amur Khabarovsk of the Kontinental Hockey League.

Kukhtinov has played for numerous Russian teams during his career.  He began his career with short spells for Krylya Sovetov Moscow, SKA Saint Petersburg and HC Neftekhimik Nizhnekamsk.  In 1998 he signed for Metallurg Novokuznetsk where he began playing more frequent hockey and spent a total of three seasons with the team.  Kukhtinov was drafted 280th overall by the New York Islanders in the 2001 NHL Entry Draft but remained in the Russian Superleague and instead signed for Salavat Yulaev Ufa where he scored career-high 11 goals during his first season.  After two seasons he moved to Severstal Cherepovets for one season before moving to Metallurg Magnitogorsk where he won the Russian Championship in 2006.  He rejoined Salavat for the 2006–07 season before moving to HC Spartak Moscow.  He joined HC CSKA Moscow for the inaugural KHL season but after 14 games he moved to Amur Khabarovsk.

Career statistics

Regular season and playoffs

International

References

External links

1975 births
Amur Khabarovsk players
HC CSKA Moscow players
HC Neftekhimik Nizhnekamsk players
Metallurg Magnitogorsk players
Metallurg Novokuznetsk players
Severstal Cherepovets players
HC Spartak Moscow players
Krylya Sovetov Moscow players
Living people
New York Islanders draft picks
Russian ice hockey defencemen
Salavat Yulaev Ufa players
SKA Saint Petersburg players
People from Belgorod
Sportspeople from Belgorod Oblast